Margherita Guidacci (April 25, 1921 – June 19, 1992), was an Italian poet born in Florence, Italy. She graduated from the University of Florence in 1943 and traveled to England and Ireland in 1947.

Guidacci married the sociologist Lucca Pinna in 1949, and they moved to Rome in 1957. The poet taught English language and literature at the Liceo Scientifico Cavour for ten years, from 1965 to 1975.

Literary style
The poetry of Margherita Guidacci is deeply spiritual but not in the religious sense. Rather her poems include profound sentiments and a view of life as a search for regeneration and resurrection from death. Guidacci regarded life as a passage and its desolation and pain a means toward transformation beyond death.

Translator of English poets
Guidacci is noted for her Italian translations of English poets, including  John Donne's sermons and Emily Dickinson's poetry. T. S. Eliot and Elizabeth Bishop are among other poets Guidacci translated into her native language.

English education
Guidacci obtained the libera docenza in the English language and literature in 1972. From 1975 to 1981, she taught English and American Literature at the University of Macerata and the College of Maria Assunta attached to the Vatican in Rome, where she lived until her death in 1992.

Literary awards
The year following her husband's death in 1977, Guidacci was awarded the Biela Poesia literary prize for her collection Il vuoto e le forme. Guidacci traveled to the United States in 1986, and was the recipient of the 1987 Premio Caserta for her complete works. Among literary prizes Guidacci was awarded are: Carducci Prize, 1957; Ceppo Prize, 1971; Lerici Prize, 1972; Gabbici Prize, 1974; Seanno Prize, 1976.

Coined "paparazzi"
The English usage of the word paparazzi is credited to Margherita Guidacci’s translation of Victorian writer George Gissing’s travel book By the Ionian Sea (1901). A character in Margherita Guidacci's Sulle Rive dello Ionio (1957) is a restaurant-owner named Coriolano Paparazzo. The name was in turn chosen by Ennio Flaiano, the screenwriter of the Federico Fellini film, La Dolce Vita, who got it from Guidacci's book. By the late 1960s, the word, usually in the Italian plural form paparazzi, had entered the English lexicon as a generic term for intrusive photographers.

Published works

Translations

References

External links
 Contemporary Italian Women Poets
 Encyclopedia of Italian Literary Studies - Margherita Guidacci, edited by Gaetana Marrone, Paolo Puppa

Italian women poets
1921 births
1992 deaths
20th-century Italian women writers
20th-century Italian poets
Writers from Florence